Pro Plus is a Slovenian multimedia company (d.o.o.) for television management, television productions, films of international studios, and sales of television advertising time. Pro Plus operates the commercial television programs Pop TV, Kanal A, Brio, Oto and Kino, the media web site 24ur.com, the specialized web sites Zadovoljna.si, Bibaleze.si, Cekin.si, Vizita.si, Frendi and Flirt, Moškisvet.com, Okusno.je and Dominvrt.si.

In September 2011, Pro Plus also launched the first Slovenian S-VOD (subscription video on demand) service called Voyo, a multiplatform service with varied contents.

Since 2009, its director general is Pavel Vrabec, formerly manager of various Slovenian radio stations before joining Pro Plus in 1996. As of 2019 CME tried to sell the group to Slovenia Broadband a unit of the Liberty Global group but the sale was aborted.

Commercial TV stations 
POP TV is a Slovenian commercial television station operated by Pro Plus. It is the TV channel with the highest ratings in Slovenia for 2013.

Kanal A is the first commercial television station in Slovenia with national coverage. In its primary target group of viewers (18–49 years), Kanal A is the second most watched TV programme in Slovenia.

Since 1 December 2010 Pop TV and Kanal A are programming in the digital (DVB-T) technique. Transmission is since 14 October 2013 part of the national digital multiplex called multiplex C.

Thematic channels 

Pro Plus offers thematic channels BRIO, OTO and KINO within the existing programming schemes of TV operators.

Brio is an all-day channel broadcast by the multimedia company Pro Plus. The channel includes the latest and popular humoristic, crime and reality series. Every month BRIO presents new programmes.

Oto is the only Slovenian all-day children channel with cartoons dubbed in Slovene which is broadcast by the media company Pro Plus.

Kino is the first channel with all-day film programming of all genres broadcast by the media company Pro Plus. The channel includes a large choice of films, from commercial hits to film marathons.

Web site 
Pro Plus' 24ur.com news website was the most visited site in Slovenia in October 2013. Other Pro Plus-operated thematic websites also rank among the first 20 websites of the country: on the 6th place the health portal "Vizita.si", on the 10th place the women's portal Zadovoljna.si, on the 12th place at the men's portal Moskisvet.com, on the 16th place at the maternity web site  Bibaleze.si, on the 17th place Okusno.je, on the 19th place th financial portal Cekin.si and on the 20th place Dominvrt.si. The portal Voyo.si is ranked on 14. place.

References

External links
 Official website

Mass media companies of Slovenia
Slovenian companies established in 1995
Mass media companies established in 1995
Film production companies of Slovenia